Shivaji Guruvayoor (born 28 May 1961) is an Indian actor who works in Malayalam cinema. He started his film career with the film Arabikkatha.He is known for his negative roles and character roles.

Personal life
He is married to Lilly and has two sons.

Filmography

All films are in Malayalam language unless otherwise noted.

Television career

References

External links
 
 Shivaji Guruvayoor at MSI

Living people
Male actors in Malayalam cinema
Indian male film actors
People from Thrissur
Male actors from Kerala
People from Guruvayur
20th-century Indian male actors
21st-century Indian male actors
1960 births
Male actors from Thrissur